Glipostena ponomarenkoi is an extinct species of beetle in the genus Glipostena. The species was described from the late Eocene Rovno amber of Ukraine in 2009.

References

Mordellidae
Beetles described in 2009
Rovno amber